Mmanwu  is a traditional masquerade of the Igbo people of Southeastern Nigeria. They are performed only by males in exclusive secret societies and involve the use of elaborate, colorful costumes that are meant to invoke ancestral spirits. Masquerade traditions have a varied range of purposes that span from performing elements of epic drama derived from community cosmology and lore, ushering in new months and seasons, honoring totems and ancestral spirits, enactments of parables or myths, with entertainment and community building serving as a consistent commonality. In the past masquerades also bore judicial, social regulatory, and even policing powers, however though these functions have decreased in modern times.

Etymology 
The word "Mmanwu" in Igbo means "spirits of the dead". It is the combination of two Igbo words "mmuo" or "maa" which means spirit and "onwu" which means death. This refers to the purpose behind Mmanwu which is to create physical representations of spirits and ancestors through the adornment of the masks.

Types of Mmanwu 

There are two basic types of masquerades, visible and invisible.

Visible masquerades 

The visible masquerades are meant for the public. They often are more entertaining.  Masks used offer a visually appeal for their shapes and forms. In these visual masquerades, performances of harassment, music, dance, and parodies are acted out (Oyeneke 25). These dramatic performances often depict stories of daily life with a moralistic bent that highlights the social norms that the Mmanwu so closely enforce. The local instruments used in these depictions are integral to the spiritual intention of the stories and the actual masks themselves include a great deal of artistic drama. It has been argued that this has been the most resilient type of Mmanwu since the others have sometimes lost prominence with changing social institutions and structures. Ceremonial Mmanwu has even been incorporated into other religious celebrations such as the inclusion of Mmanwu in Igbo Christmas and Easter parades.

Invisible masquerades 
The invisible masquerades take place at night. Sound is the main tool for them. The masquerader uses his voice to scream so it may be heard throughout the village. The masks used are usually fierce looking and their interpretation is only fully understood by the society members. These invisible masquerades call upon a silent village to strike fear in the hearts of those not initiated into their society.

Achikwu Ocha/Oji (regulatory Mmanwu) 
The achikwu ocha (white) masquerade acts as village surveillance. The "entertainment" activities include "singing, joking, and dancing" (Oyeneke 22). Achikwu ojii (black) is the other side of the achikwu ocha masquerade. This is performed not only to protect the village, but also when there is going to be a punishment or execution of a criminal

Mmanwu is a way for Igbo people to regulate and discipline members of their society. Mmanwu will work alongside the Igbo community's political assembly, often stepping into action when the political assembly has reached a stalemate in a certain issue. They work to execute pre-determined and long-standing social norms, often using symbolic messaging. One example of this comes from an interview Bess Reed held with an Igbo woman. The woman discusses how after she complained to prominent members of her community about stolen mangos from her tree, the Mmanwu marked her mango tree overnight with fresh palm leaves and no thievery occurred thereafter. The Mmanwu is a salient example of an informal organization.

Agu Mmuno 
In these masquerades, horrible screaming sounds are produced to create fear.

Ogbagu 
This third category is "strictly used for dance entertainment" (Oyeneke 22).

Examples of Mmanwu representations 

 Nkita Oku - Represents an eager and stubborn teenager that carries fire and lights the fire from a torch light on people's heads.
 Adanma - Represents the elegance of an Igbo woman and the idea of maidenhood.
 Iga - represents a masquerade that appears in the daytime and makes sure all is good.

Gender roles in Mmanwu 
The Mmanwu practice is limited to male participants and there are strict rules governing how each gender interacts with the masquerade. Men are solely responsible for the creation, care, and use of the masks. The induction of members into mask-making societies serves as a male rite of passage in some Igbo societies. Since men are masqueraders, they are buried within their homes so their spirits may be close to their families and return to the earthly world from time to time to offer spiritual advice (Chiene 10).

Conversely, women are prohibited from touching the masks or even understanding the spiritual meaning behind the mask. Women are able to observe the ceremony and many do so, but they are careful to keep their distance. Both genders work to maintain the secrecy surrounding the ceremony, as it is forbidden to share the process outside of the mask making societies.

References

 Chiene, Gabriel.  Mmanwu Festival: Masquerade as an Entertainer. Anambra State:  Ministry of Information, 1990.
 Obuh, Sulvanus Onwukaike Stanley.  The Theatrical Use of Masks in Igbo Areas of Nigeria.  Ann Arbor:  University Microfilms International, 1984.
 Onyeneke, Augustine.  The Dead Among The Living: Masquerades in Igbo Society. Province of Nigeria: Holy Ghost Congregation, 1987.
 Perani, Judith and Fred T. Smith.  The Visual Arts of Africa. Upper Saddle River: Prentice Hall, 1998.

External links
Masks And Masquerades of Oraifite Igbo Land

Igbo religion
Igbo culture
Masquerade ceremonies in Africa